Kouh Kamar (also Romanized as Kūh Kamar and Kooh Kamar; also known as Chyuchamar, Kūkamar, and Kukomar) is a village in Zonuzaq Rural District, in the Central District of Marand County, East Azerbaijan Province, Iran. At the 2006 census, its population was 861, in 182 families.

References 

Populated places in Marand County